The 1978 Lewisham London Borough Council election for the Lewisham London Borough Council was held in May 1978.  The whole council was up for election. Turnout was 38.6%.

Election result

|}

Ward results

References

1978
1978 London Borough council elections